Auriol may refer to:

People
 Didier Auriol (b. 1958), French rally driver and World Rally Champion
 George Auriol, alias of Jean-Georges Huyot (1863–1938), French poet, songwriter, painter, graphic designer, illustrator, and type designer
 Hubert Auriol (1952–2021), French racing driver and former director of the Paris-Dakar Rally
 Jacqueline Auriol, née Jacqueline Douet (1917–2000), French aviator who set several world speed records
 Peter Auriol, also known as Pierre Auriol and Petrus Aureolus ( – 1322), medieval Franciscan theologian and philosopher
 Vincent Auriol (1884–1966), French politician who served as first President of the Fourth Republic from 1947 to 1954

Other uses
 Auriol, Bouches-du-Rhône, a town in southern France
 Auriol, Mississippi, fictitious home of Blanche DuBois in the film A Streetcar Named Desire
 Auriol, a novel by William Harrison Ainsworth
 Auriol (typeface), a typeface

See also
 Oriel (disambiguation)